WXTX (channel 54) is a television station in Columbus, Georgia, United States, affiliated with the Fox network. It is owned by American Spirit Media, which maintains a shared services agreement (SSA) with Gray Television, owner of ABC affiliate WTVM (channel 9), for the provision of certain services. Gray also operates dual NBC/CW+ affiliate WLTZ (channel 38) under a separate SSA with owner SagamoreHill Broadcasting. WXTX and WTVM share studios (which also house master control and most internal operations for WLTZ) on Wynnton Road (GA 22) in the Dinglewood section of Columbus; WXTX's transmitter is located in the Vista Terrace section of South Columbus.

History
The station signed on August 29, 1983 as the market's second independent television outlet after Opelika, Alabama's WSWS-TV (channel 66). Less than three years later on April 5, 1987, it became a Fox affiliate and has remained with the network ever since the network's prime time launch. The station is the network's longest serving Georgia affiliate after Fox dropped WATL for New World-owned WAGA-TV in Atlanta. By 1993, WXTX grew to a seven night network affiliate after Fox expanded its programming offerings. The station was named a top ten affiliate with the network in November 1994 for its prime time audience share. It has subsequently been named to the "Fox Number One Club" several times, most recently in 2007, in recognition of the station's sweeps ratings.

On September 5, 2006, it became the area's secondary MyNetworkTV affiliate after The CW chose then-UPN station WLGA to become its affiliate in Columbus. The CW is currently seen on a second digital subchannel of NBC affiliate WLTZ. Originally, WXTX aired programming from MyNetworkTV on weeknights from 11 until 1 in the morning. For Saturday night prime time, that network was shown early Sunday mornings from 12:30 until 2:30. It eventually shifted to the Tuesday through Saturday time slot of midnight until 2 a.m. after the network transitioned to a programming service. In 2012, WXTX dropped MyNetworkTV as a secondary affiliation; this left Columbus with no affiliate of the service until 2017, when WLTZ launched MyNetworkTV in prime time on its third digital subchannel, which airs Antenna TV at all other times.

At one point, the station offered The Tube (a 24-hour automated music video network) on a second digital subchannel. This was dropped on October 1, 2007, when the service shut down due to a lack of advertising revenue. WXTX's broadcasts became digital-only, effective June 12, 2009.

Programming

Syndicated programming
Syndicated programming on WXTX includes The Big Bang Theory, Judge Judy, Rachael Ray, and Maury among others.

News operation

Since 2004 through a news share agreement, WTVM has been producing the Chattahoochee Valley's only prime time newscast on WXTX called Fox 54 News at 10, which airs weeknights for an hour (thirty minutes on weekends) from the ABC affiliate's facility on Wynnton Road/SR 22 Spur in the Dinglewood section of Columbus. In 2007, the ABC outlet began airing an hour-long extension of its weekday morning show on WXTX under the name Fox 54 Morning News, this program aired for an hour starting at 7 and offered a local alternative to the national morning broadcasts on the big three stations in Columbus. The production was eventually cancelled most likely due to inconsistent viewership and/or low ratings.

WXTX's newscasts have a separate music package and graphics theme from WTVM and employs the use of the ABC affiliate's primary set but modified with duratrans indicating the Fox-branded show. Although WXTX features the majority of WTVM's on-air personnel, this station maintains a separate additional news anchor on weeknights that can fill-in on WTVM when necessary.

In late-October 2010, HD-ready graphics began to be seen in weather forecasting segments indicating WTVM and WXTX would be making the switch to high definition newscasts. The entire graphics package made a full switch to an updated theme in January 2011. On February 16, 2012, production of Fox 54 News at 10 moved to the newsroom while a temporary weather office was constructed in the hallway between the editing bay and the newsroom. The main set during this time was finally upgraded to high definition. The new HD set and transition to high definition news was completed on March 14 at which point WXTX retained the same graphics scheme and news music package. On July 25, 2012, WXTX debuted an updated set of Raycom Media corporate graphics and a new music package.

On September 17, 2012, the station launched a weeknight half-hour newscast at 7. Since Alabama (which is in the Central Time Zone) is an hour behind Georgia, this program is the only local news catering to viewers on the western side of the market airing at 6. Viewers in those areas also have access to stations from Dothan and Montgomery offering broadcasts geared for the Central Time Zone. In addition to WTVM's main studios, that station also operates an East Alabama Bureau on Executive Park Drive in Opelika offering coverage of that city (in addition to Auburn and Phenix City).

Subchannels
The station's digital signal is multiplexed:

References

External links
Official website

Television channels and stations established in 1983
XTX
Fox network affiliates
MeTV affiliates
Ion Mystery affiliates
Dabl affiliates
Heroes & Icons affiliates
Start TV affiliates
Gray Television
1983 establishments in Georgia (U.S. state)